Middle Binyang Cave is cave number 140 at the Longmen Grottoes near Luoyang, Henan, China.

Dimensions
12m long, 10.9m wide, 9.3m high.

History
Constructed by order of Emperor Xuanwu of the Northern Wei in honour of his parents Emperor Xiaowen and Empress Wenzhao, the cave was supposed to imitate Lingyansi Cave at the Yungang Caves.  Work began in 500 and was completed in 523.  In 1987 a brick-entrance was demolished to reveal two new figures: a four-headed, four-armed Brahma and a one headed, four armed Śakra devendra.

Features
The back wall is a carved Sakyamuni, with two disciples and two bodhisattvas.  The main Buddha and bodhisattvas are representative of the Northern Wei sculptural style.  A lotus-flower pool decorates the floor.  The ceiling is engraved with a blossoming lotus flower, 8 musical apsarases, 2 attending apsarases and tassel and drapery patterns.  The front wall is covered with a large Vimalakirti relief, the Prince Sattva jataka, the Prince Sudatta jataka, an emperor/empress worshipping scene and ten deity kings.

Nearby caves
The cave is flanked by North and South Binyang Caves.

Images

Chinese architectural history
Chinese Buddhist grottoes
Chinese sculpture
Caves of Henan
Tourist attractions in Henan
Religion in Henan